Colonel André D. Gauthier OMM, CD (1935 – October 26, 2017), was a Canadian army officer, monument sculptor and designer in various materials including bronze casting. He was also an artist in oil painting, charcoal, and watercolours. Many of his works are connected with the profession of arms in the Canadian Army, Navy and Air Force.

The Royal Military College of Canada Gauthier Collection consists of 60 sculptures. His works are found in military and private collections in Canada, the United States, and internationally. Military units have presented his sculptures to cities with which they have had a long association.  His works have been presented to a member of the British royal family, the Governor General of Canada, two Canadian prime ministers, Canadian cabinet ministers and dozens of visiting foreign dignitaries.  Five of his works are in the permanent art collection of the Canadian War Museum.

Life and work
André D. Gauthier  was born in 1935 in Ottawa, Ontario, Canada. He was educated in Montreal. He studied at the University of Ottawa on the Regular Officer Training Plan. He served as a troop commander with a reserve armoured regiment, the Régiment de Hull.  He was commissioned in May 1958 in the Canadian Provost Corps. He served as an infantry platoon commander in the First Battalion, The Queen's Own Rifles of Canada; No 1 Provost Platoon in Calgary, Alberta; the Kingston Provost Detachment and at Base Valcartier, Que.  In 1962-65, Captain Gauthier was posted to Germany with a Military Police staff appointment and No 4 Provost Platoon. In 1965, he served at the Canadian Forces School of Intelligence and Security in Infantry Phase I Officer Training.  He attended the Canadian Army Staff College in Kingston, Ont. Promoted to Major in 1967, he served at Mobile Command Headquarters in St. Hubert, Que.  In 1969, he became the Senior Staff Officer Security.

In 1970, he was promoted to Lieutenant Colonel with Regional Civil Emergency Operations Section of Mobile Command, Quebec.  In 1973, he served as Vice-Commandant and Director of Cadets at Collège militaire royal de Saint-Jean and the Ducros Commission. In 1976-8, Colonel Gauthier was assigned as the Canadian Forces Attaché to Yugoslavia and Greece. He served as Director of Security at National Defence Headquarters 1976-80. He attended the National Defence College in Kingston, Ont in 1980/81. He served as the Chief of Staff for Headquarters Prairie Militia Area in Winnipeg, Manitoba.

From 1983-86, he served with the Canadian delegation to the conventional arms control negotiations (MBFR Talks) between NATO and the Warsaw Pact in Vienna, Austria. From 1986-89, he was Commandant of the unit administering Canada's National Defence Headquarters in Ottawa.

Awards and recognition
In November 1989, Colonel Gauthier was awarded the Order of Military Merit by the Governor General of Canada.

Non-military works

Non-military subjects by André D. Gauthier include:
 a bronze bas-relief marking the centennial of St. John Ambulance Canada,
 portrait busts.
 a life-size statue 'Madeleine', of his daughter.
 an equestrian statue for Parliament Hill to honour in 1992 the 40th year of Her Majesty The Queen's reign (1990).
 wildlife animal sculptures (1996).

Exhibits
André Gauthier's works have been featured in newspaper articles, TV documentaries and radio interviews. His works were exhibited at the Canadian War Museum in Ottawa, at the Mill of Kintail museum in Mississippi Mills, Ontario, at the Military Museum of Canadian Forces Base Petawawa, and at the Royal Military College of Canada Museum. His works were exhibited at the Royal Military College Saint-Jean in the context of the centennial of the Royal 22nd Regiment.

References

External links

1935 births
2017 deaths
Canadian sculptors
Canadian male sculptors
Artists from Ottawa
University of Ottawa alumni